Joseph Edwin Maxwell (born March 17, 1957) is an American attorney who served as the 45th Lieutenant Governor of the state of Missouri. He is a Democrat who also served in the Missouri House of Representatives and the Missouri Senate. To date, he is the last member of the Democratic Party to be elected Lieutenant Governor of Missouri.

Personal history
Joseph Edwin Maxwell was born in Kirksville, Missouri and grew up on a farm near Rush Hill in rural Audrain County, Missouri. He is a graduate of Community R-VI High School in Laddonia and received his higher education at the University of Missouri. Maxwell earned a Bachelor of Science in Education from Mizzou in 1986, and his Juris Doctor from the University of Missouri School of Law in 1990. Prior to receiving his higher education, Maxwell worked as a rural mail carrier for the U.S Postal Service and also operated a small business with his twin brother. Joe Maxwell is a military veteran who retired in 1995 with the rank of First Sergeant after twenty years in the Missouri National Guard. Maxwell and wife Sarah are the parents of three daughters. He later became an attorney in private practice in Mexico, Missouri with the firm of Hagan, Hamlett and Maxwell and Council Member of Missourians for a Balanced Energy Future.

Political history
Joe Maxwell served two terms in the Missouri House of Representatives, being elected in 1990 and again in 1992. In 1994 Maxwell ran for and won election to the Missouri Senate representing the 18th District. He easily defeated Republican challenger James Lemon in 1998 to win reelection. Joe Maxwell was elected to statewide office in 2000, defeating Republican Wendell Bailey in the race for Missouri Lieutenant Governor. He chose not to run for the office again in 2004, citing his wife's health problems.

References

1957 births
Lieutenant Governors of Missouri
Living people
Democratic Party members of the Missouri House of Representatives
Missouri lawyers
Democratic Party Missouri state senators
People from Kirksville, Missouri
People from Audrain County, Missouri
University of Missouri alumni
People from Mexico, Missouri